Caulerpa macrodisca is a species of seaweed in the Caulerpaceae family.

The species is found in the subtidal areas tropical and subtropical waters in the western Pacific and Easter Indian oceans. In Western Australia, it is found along the coast in the Kimberley and south as far as the Mid West region.

References

macrodisca
Species described in 1842